Zazu may refer to:

 Ray Farrugia (born 1955; nicknamed "Zazu"), Maltese football coach and former player
 Zazu (The Lion King), a character in the film The Lion King
 Zazu (album), 1986 debut album by Rosie Vela

See also
 ZaSu Pitts (1894–1963), American actress